Martin Mareš (born 23 January 1982 in Blansko) is a retired Czech cyclist.

Palmares

2004
1st Czech National Road Race Championships U23
8th stage Tour de l'Avenir

2005
1st overall Tour of Qinghai Lake

2007
7th stage Tour of Qinghai Lake
2nd overall Tour de Slovaquie

2009
1st Czech National Road Race Championships

References

1982 births
Living people
Czech male cyclists
People from Blansko
Sportspeople from the South Moravian Region